Kayacık may refer to:

People
 Oya Kayacık (1938–2020), Turkish nurse

Places in Turkey
 Kayacık, Adıyaman
 Kayacık, Amasya
 Kayacık, Çavdır
 Kayacık, Ezine
 Kayacık, İliç
 Kayacık, Kestel
 Kayacık, Kulp
 Kayacık, Yapraklı
 Kayacık Dam